, also known as Confession of Murder, is a 2017 Japanese detective thriller film that is a remake of the 2012 South Korean film Confession of Murder. The film was directed by Yū Irie and stars Tatsuya Fujiwara as Sonezaki and Hideaki Itō as Ko Makimura.

Plot 
In 1995, five mysterious murders took place. In 2017, a man named Masato Sonezaki comes public confessing that he is the murderer, but the police cannot arrest him due to a loophole in the law. Sonezaki publishes a book and becomes a celebrity. Later, another man  claims to be the real murderer. But then it is revealed that both of them are frauds. Sonezaki confesses that he wanted to capture the real killer while the other man wanted financial success. Sonezaki is revealed to be Takumi Onodera, whose fiancé was killed by that killer. Later, Sonezaki finds out the real killer's hideout and tries to kill him. Detective Kō Makimura comes and stops Sonezaki. The killer is then taken to police custody.

In a post-credit scene, a man attempts to kill the killer to avenge his mother.

Cast 
 Tatsuya Fujiwara as Masato Sonezaki, who claims himself to be the murderer.
 Hideaki Itō as Kō Makimura, a detective.
 Kaho
 Shuhei Nomura
 Anna Ishibashi
 Ryo Ryusei
 Taichi Saotome
 Mitsuru Hirata
 Koichi Iwaki
 Toru Nakamura
 Ryo Iwamatsu

References

External links 
  
 

Japanese remakes of South Korean films
Japanese action thriller films
Nippon TV films
Japanese serial killer films
Japanese crime films
Films directed by Yu Irie
2017 crime films
2017 action thriller films
2010s Japanese films